Chajka Klinger (in Hebrew: חייקה קלינגר; born on September 25, 1917, Będzin, Zagłębie Dąbrowskie, Poland - April 18, 1958, Israel) was the leader of the Jewish Fighting Organization in Bedzino ghetto, interrogated under torture by the Gestapo, escaped and was the first of the ghetto fighters to arrive to Israel.

Biography 
Chajka Klinger was born on September 25, 1917, in the city of Będzin in the Zaglebie region of southwestern Poland. She was a member to a poor Hasidic family that barely supported itself through a grocery store run by Chajka's mother, Perla (Schwinkelstein) Klinger. Her father, Leibel, spent his time studying the Torah his whole life. Chajka was accepted into the bilingual Furstenberg Gymnasium in Bedzin. She became fluent in several languages, including: Polish, Yiddish, Hebrew and German. In the 1930, she joined the local branch of Hashomer Hatzair, it was a Zionist-Socialist youth movement, and quickly became the group leader and a member of the local leadership. In 1938, she joined her comrades in Kalisz to train and prepare for immigrating to Israel.

Hashomer Hatzair 
Klinger tried to arrange immigration to Mandatory Palestine in September 1939, but the war changed her plans. Her effort to escape from Poland via  Vilna with her boyfriend, Dawid Kozlowski, failed. In the spring of 1940 she was instructed by the Hashomer Hatzair leadership in Vilna to stay in Będzin and restore movement activity there. Klinger and Kozlowski, became the leading figures in the new branch of Ha-Shomer hazair in Będzin.

Condemned to Live 
On August 1, 1943, at the beginning of the last deportation of the Będzin Jews, Chajka was in an underground bunker, planning to fight. The bunker was uncovered and a handgun was found in her purse. She was taken for interrogation and severely tortured by the Gestapo. She returned to her friends covered in dark bruises from the beatings she had received. The Germans listed her to be sent to Auschwitz. She said, “I will not go to Auschwitz,” and with the help of friends, she successfully fled from detention camp and found a hiding place in the village of Dąbrówka.

At the end of December 1943, Chajka and a few other survivors managed to cross the Slovakian border. They were greeted by local underground activists under the leadership of Yaakov Rosenberg, a member of Hashomer Hatzair. Chajka and Yaakov eventually fell in love.

In January 1944, Klinger was smuggled into Hungary and joined the members of her movement in Budapest. When she delivered her report, Chajka's accounts shocked her listeners both in Slovakia and in Hungary. Her comrades rejected her proposals to organize a Jewish revolt. One of them stated ironically, “I don’t want a kibbutz in Israel to be named after me - I want to live in one”.

Land of Israel 
In March 1944, using one of the small number of immigration certificates that could be obtained in Hungary, she left legally to Mandatory Palestine. She crossed the Balkans, traveled through Istanbul, Syria and Lebanon, and finally arrived in Haifa.

In 1944, Klinger married Yaakov Rosenberg and the two settled in Kibbutz Haogen. Klinger began to adjust to the kibbutz life, and simultaneously began to prepare for the publication of the diaries that she had written while in hiding in Poland. She never completed this project, and at a certain stage, apparently after the birth of her first child, Zvi, she decided not to continue with her writing. She later gave birth to two more children, Avihu and Arnon.

Her writings were published in forms of journals and collections, and she was not satisfied with the way they edited, simplified and censored the whole story of her past life. In 1958, Chajka no longer had the strength to live more. She took her own life away on the fifth anniversary of the Warsaw Ghetto uprising.

See also 

 Hashomer Hatzair
 Jewish Fighting Organization

Notes 

 Chajka Klinger Jewish Women's Archive

References 

Polish women in World War II resistance
Jewish resistance members during the Holocaust
1917 births
1958 deaths
Jewish women activists
Polish emigrants to Mandatory Palestine
Suicides in Israel
Israeli Jews
Israeli people of Polish-Jewish descent
Hashomer Hatzair members
Polish Zionists
Polish torture victims
Kibbutzniks
Jews in Mandatory Palestine